ANKAmall is the second largest shopping centre in Turkey after Cevahir Mall from İstanbul. It was opened on 27 August 1999 as Migros Shopping Centre.

References

External links
 Official site
 Mobilworx - The on-site shop

Shopping malls in Ankara